Heriades is a genus of bee in the family Megachilidae. Fairly small and usually black, they are found all over the world. There are more than 130 species worldwide, roughly 25 species in North and Central America, but only 3 species are native east of the Rocky Mountains. European species such as H. truncorum can be found on the east coast of the US. Like other bees in the tribe Osmiini, Hoplitis and Ashmeadiella, they nest in cavities in wood excavated by other insects, or perhaps occasionally pine cones. They separate the cells of their nest with resin (most of the time).

See also
 List of Heriades species

References

Bee genera
Megachilidae